Tetratheca setigera is a species of plant in the quandong family that is endemic to Australia.

Description
The species grows as an erect or diffuse shrub to 20–80 cm in height. The pink-purple flowers appear from August to December.

Distribution and habitat
The species occurs within the Esperance Plains, Jarrah Forest, Swan Coastal Plain and Warren IBRA bioregions of south-west Western Australia. The plants grow on slopes, flats and swampy areas with sandy and gravelly soils.

References

setigera
Eudicots of Western Australia
Oxalidales of Australia
Taxa named by Stephan Endlicher
Plants described in 1837